Miles Peter Andrews (1742 – 18 July 1814) was an 18th-century English playwright, gunpowder manufacturer and politician who sat in the House of Commons from 1796 to 1814.

Biography

Andrews was the son of William Andrews, a drysalter of Watling Street and his wife Catherine Pigou. After helping his father in business in the day time, he was "accustomed to sally forth in the evening with sword and bag to Ranelagh or some other public place". He gradually made useful social connections and became a constant companion of Lord Lyttelton. He wrote plays musicals and operas. The first was performed at Drury Lane in 1774. In 1775 the opera diva Ann Cargill aged 15 ran away with him and she then had to be restrained at home by a court order. Andrews had several further plays performed at the Haymarket. Andrews lived in a mansion at Green Park where he entertained the fashionable society of London, and was a member of several clubs.

With his uncle Frederick Pigou, a director of the British East India Company, Andrews became the owner of an extensive gunpowder factory at Hawley Mills on the River Darent at Dartford, Kent.
George Colman the Younger described Andrews as "one of the most persevering poetical pests", and his plays as "like his powder mills, particularly hazardous affairs, and in great danger of going off with a sudden and violent explosion". This was no idle comparison as an explosion occurred in October 1790.

"Between four and five o'clock this afternoon (October 12th 1790) the people here, and in the neighbourhood, were terribly alarmed by the blowing up of Mr Pegu (sic)'s Powder Mills, within a short mile of this town.."

In 1796 Andrews succeeded Lord Lyttleton as Member of Parliament for Bewdley which he represented until his death in 1814. There is a memorial to him in St James's Church, Piccadilly.

Works
 The Conjuror - a farce -  Drury Lane 1774
 The Election - a musical interlude - Drury Lane 1774
 Belphegor, or the Wishes, a comic opera - Drury Lane 1778
 Summer Amusement, or an Adventure at Margate, written with William Augustus Miles, - the Haymarket 1779
 Fire and Water, a ballad opera, - the Haymarket in 1780
 Dissipation, a comedy -  Drury Lane 1781;
 The Baron Kinkvervankotsdorsprakingatchdern, a musical comedy - the Haymarket 1781
 The Best Bidder, a farce - the Haymarket 1782
 Reparation, a comedy - Drury Lane 1784
 Better Late than Never - Drury Lane 1790
 The Mysteries of the Castle - Covent Garden 1795.

Notes

References

External links 
 

1742 births
1814 deaths
English dramatists and playwrights
English businesspeople
Members of the Parliament of Great Britain for English constituencies
British MPs 1796–1800
Members of the Parliament of the United Kingdom for English constituencies
UK MPs 1801–1802
UK MPs 1802–1806
UK MPs 1806–1807
UK MPs 1807–1812
Place of birth unknown
Place of death missing
Date of birth unknown
English male dramatists and playwrights